Katharine Barker may refer to:

 Katharine Barker (actress) (born 1941), English actress
 Katharine Marie Barker (1891–1984), American painter
 Kate Barker (Katharine Mary Barker, born 1957), British economist

See also
 Katherine Barker (disambiguation)
 Catherine Barker, British figure skater
 Kate Barker (disambiguation)
 Kathy Barker (born 1953), American scientist and science fiction writer